Mario Mendoza Cortés (25 July 1968 – 25 September 2015) was a Mexican politician from the Institutional Revolutionary Party. He studied in Benemérita University the Puebla, Columbia Business School and Columbia College. He served as Deputy of the  LX Legislature of the Mexican Congress representing Puebla.

In the early hours of 26 September 2015, Cortés died in a road accident in the State of Hidalgo.

References

1968 births
2015 deaths
People from Puebla
Institutional Revolutionary Party politicians
Road incident deaths in Mexico
21st-century Mexican politicians
Deputies of the LX Legislature of Mexico
Members of the Chamber of Deputies (Mexico) for Puebla